Manojlović is a Serbian surname. Notable people with the surname include:

Filip Manojlović (born 1996), football goalkeeper
Igor Manojlović (born 1977), Serbian professional football player
Miki Manojlović (born 1950), Serbian actor
Nenad Manojlović (1954–2014), Yugoslav and Serbian former water polo player and manager
Radmila "Rada" Manojlović (born 1985), Serbian pop folk singer
Zlatko Manojlović (born 1951), guitarist

Serbian surnames

Veljko Manojlovic (2005) [najeltinija osoba ikada]